The Braille pattern dots-24 is a 6-dot braille cell with the top right and middle left dots raised, or an 8-dot braille cell with the top right and upper-middle dots raised. It is represented by the Unicode code point U+280a, and in Braille ASCII with I.

Unified Braille

In unified international braille, the braille pattern dots-24 is used to represent unrounded, close or near-close, front vowel, such as /i/, /ɪ/, or /ɨ/. It is also used for the number 9.

Table of unified braille values

Other braille

Plus dots 7 and 8

Related to Braille pattern dots-24 are Braille patterns 247, 248, and 2478, which are used in 8-dot braille systems, such as Gardner-Salinas and Luxembourgish Braille.

Related 8-dot kantenji patterns

In the Japanese kantenji braille, the standard 8-dot Braille patterns 35, 135, 345, and 1345 are the patterns related to Braille pattern dots-24, since the two additional dots of kantenji patterns 024, 247, and 0247 are placed above the base 6-dot cell, instead of below, as in standard 8-dot braille.

Kantenji using braille patterns 35, 135, 345, or 1345

This listing includes kantenji using Braille pattern dots-24 for all 6349 kanji found in JIS C 6226-1978.

  - 頁

Variants and thematic compounds

  -  selector 1 + お/頁  =  丸
  -  お/頁 + selector 1  =  君
  -  お/頁 + selector 4  =  首
  -  数 + #9  =  九

Compounds of 頁

  -  な/亻 + お/頁  =  傾
  -  仁/亻 + お/頁  =  領
  -  や/疒 + お/頁  =  嶺
  -  お/頁 + す/発  =  夏
  -  心 + お/頁  =  榎
  -  よ/广 + お/頁 + す/発  =  厦
  -  れ/口 + お/頁 + す/発  =  嗄
  -  selector 1 + お/頁 + す/発  =  夐
  -  へ/⺩ + お/頁 + す/発  =  瓊
  -  火 + お/頁  =  煩
  -  こ/子 + お/頁  =  項
  -  宿 + お/頁  =  頑
  -  囗 + お/頁  =  頷
  -  ん/止 + お/頁  =  頻
  -  お/頁 + た/⽥  =  顰
  -  に/氵 + ん/止 + お/頁  =  瀕
  -  心 + ん/止 + お/頁  =  蘋
  -  れ/口 + お/頁  =  額
  -  よ/广 + お/頁  =  願
  -  め/目 + お/頁  =  顛
  -  と/戸 + お/頁  =  顧
  -  お/頁 + ま/石  =  碩
  -  お/頁 + て/扌  =  頂
  -  お/頁 + か/金  =  順
  -  お/頁 + よ/广  =  預
  -  心 + お/頁 + よ/广  =  蕷
  -  お/頁 + り/分  =  頒
  -  お/頁 + ふ/女  =  頓
  -  れ/口 + お/頁 + ふ/女  =  噸
  -  お/頁 + ひ/辶  =  頗
  -  お/頁 + け/犬  =  頚
  -  お/頁 + な/亻  =  頬
  -  お/頁 + と/戸  =  頭
  -  お/頁 + 数  =  頼
  -  ふ/女 + お/頁 + 数  =  嬾
  -  る/忄 + お/頁 + 数  =  懶
  -  け/犬 + お/頁 + 数  =  獺
  -  や/疒 + お/頁 + 数  =  癩
  -  ち/竹 + お/頁 + 数  =  籟
  -  心 + お/頁 + 数  =  藾
  -  お/頁 + 龸  =  頽
  -  お/頁 + 日  =  題
  -  お/頁 + れ/口  =  顎
  -  お/頁 + う/宀/#3  =  顔
  -  お/頁 + お/頁 + う/宀/#3  =  顏
  -  お/頁 + ゐ/幺  =  顕
  -  お/頁 + の/禾  =  類
  -  お/頁 + 囗  =  賎
  -  お/頁 + お/頁 + ゐ/幺  =  顯
  -  お/頁 + お/頁 + と/戸  =  顱
  -  れ/口 + 宿 + お/頁  =  囂
  -  の/禾 + 宿 + お/頁  =  穎
  -  お/頁 + selector 6 + こ/子  =  頌
  -  お/頁 + 宿 + 宿  =  頏
  -  お/頁 + つ/土 + れ/口  =  頡
  -  お/頁 + 宿 + す/発  =  頤
  -  ね/示 + 宿 + お/頁  =  頴
  -  お/頁 + 龸 + け/犬  =  頸
  -  お/頁 + た/⽥ + き/木  =  顆
  -  お/頁 + た/⽥ + 心  =  顋
  -  お/頁 + 囗 + れ/口  =  顫
  -  お/頁 + 宿 + み/耳  =  顳
  -  お/頁 + 宿 + け/犬  =  顴
  -  や/疒 + お/頁 + て/扌  =  巓

Compounds of 丸

  -  つ/土 + お/頁  =  執
  -  を/貝 + お/頁  =  贄
  -  て/扌 + つ/土 + お/頁  =  摯
  -  む/車 + つ/土 + お/頁  =  蟄
  -  こ/子 + 宿 + お/頁  =  孰
  -  お/頁 + 火  =  熟
  -  お/頁 + つ/土  =  塾
  -  ち/竹 + selector 1 + お/頁  =  笂

Compounds of 君

  -  お/頁 + さ/阝  =  郡
  -  お/頁 + そ/馬  =  群
  -  心 + お/頁 + selector 1  =  桾
  -  う/宀/#3 + お/頁 + selector 1  =  窘
  -  そ/馬 + お/頁 + selector 1  =  羣
  -  ね/示 + お/頁 + selector 1  =  裙

Compounds of 首

  -  囗 + お/頁 + selector 4  =  馘

Compounds of 九

  -  お/頁 + 仁/亻  =  仇
  -  む/車 + お/頁  =  軌
  -  お/頁 + せ/食  =  鳩
  -  う/宀/#3 + お/頁  =  究
  -  ま/石 + お/頁  =  砕
  -  お/頁 + お/頁 + ろ/十  =  卆
  -  仁/亻 + お/頁 + ろ/十  =  伜
  -  る/忄 + 宿 + お/頁  =  忰
  -  む/車 + 宿 + お/頁  =  翆
  -  日 + 数 + お/頁  =  旭
  -  ひ/辶 + 数 + お/頁  =  馗

Other compounds

  -  龸 + お/頁  =  乞
  -  れ/口 + 龸 + お/頁  =  吃
  -  や/疒 + 龸 + お/頁  =  屹
  -  え/訁 + 龸 + お/頁  =  訖
  -  ふ/女 + お/頁  =  嫡
  -  て/扌 + お/頁  =  摘
  -  に/氵 + お/頁  =  滴
  -  お/頁 + 氷/氵  =  敵
  -  ひ/辶 + お/頁  =  適
  -  え/訁 + 宿 + お/頁  =  謫
  -  か/金 + 宿 + お/頁  =  鏑
  -  り/分 + お/頁  =  倉
  -  お/頁 + ぬ/力  =  創
  -  る/忄 + り/分 + お/頁  =  愴
  -  て/扌 + り/分 + お/頁  =  搶
  -  き/木 + り/分 + お/頁  =  槍
  -  に/氵 + り/分 + お/頁  =  滄
  -  や/疒 + り/分 + お/頁  =  瘡
  -  ふ/女 + り/分 + お/頁  =  艙
  -  く/艹 + り/分 + お/頁  =  蒼
  -  み/耳 + り/分 + お/頁  =  蹌
  -  か/金 + り/分 + お/頁  =  鎗
  -  け/犬 + お/頁  =  央
  -  る/忄 + お/頁  =  怏
  -  日 + お/頁  =  映
  -  く/艹 + お/頁  =  英
  -  日 + く/艹 + お/頁  =  暎
  -  へ/⺩ + く/艹 + お/頁  =  瑛
  -  ち/竹 + く/艹 + お/頁  =  霙
  -  ほ/方 + け/犬 + お/頁  =  殃
  -  に/氵 + け/犬 + お/頁  =  泱
  -  の/禾 + け/犬 + お/頁  =  秧
  -  と/戸 + け/犬 + お/頁  =  鞅
  -  お/頁 + 宿 + せ/食  =  鴦
  -  ち/竹 + お/頁  =  斧
  -  き/木 + お/頁  =  析
  -  に/氵 + き/木 + お/頁  =  淅
  -  日 + き/木 + お/頁  =  皙
  -  む/車 + き/木 + お/頁  =  蜥
  -  日 + 宿 + お/頁  =  晰
  -  か/金 + お/頁  =  瓩
  -  の/禾 + お/頁  =  粁
  -  氷/氵 + お/頁  =  漬
  -  ぬ/力 + お/頁  =  負
  -  ろ/十 + お/頁  =  賑
  -  お/頁 + ん/止  =  賦
  -  に/氵 + お/頁 + 囗  =  濺
  -  お/頁 + ろ/十  =  卒
  -  ⺼ + お/頁  =  膵
  -  な/亻 + お/頁 + ろ/十  =  倅
  -  つ/土 + お/頁 + ろ/十  =  埣
  -  る/忄 + お/頁 + ろ/十  =  悴
  -  に/氵 + お/頁 + ろ/十  =  淬
  -  け/犬 + お/頁 + ろ/十  =  猝
  -  や/疒 + お/頁 + ろ/十  =  瘁
  -  む/車 + お/頁 + ろ/十  =  翠
  -  く/艹 + お/頁 + ろ/十  =  萃
  -  ま/石 + ま/石 + お/頁  =  碎
  -  お/頁 + に/氵  =  鬼
  -  お/頁 + ゑ/訁  =  魃
  -  お/頁 + き/木  =  魅
  -  せ/食 + お/頁  =  醜
  -  な/亻 + お/頁 + に/氵  =  傀
  -  や/疒 + お/頁 + に/氵  =  嵬
  -  る/忄 + お/頁 + に/氵  =  愧
  -  心 + お/頁 + に/氵  =  槐
  -  へ/⺩ + お/頁 + に/氵  =  瑰
  -  く/艹 + お/頁 + に/氵  =  蒐
  -  さ/阝 + お/頁 + に/氵  =  隗
  -  せ/食 + お/頁 + に/氵  =  餽
  -  日 + お/頁 + に/氵  =  魄
  -  の/禾 + お/頁 + に/氵  =  魏
  -  や/疒 + う/宀/#3 + お/頁  =  巍
  -  よ/广 + お/頁 + に/氵  =  魘
  -  お/頁 + 宿 + と/戸  =  魁
  -  お/頁 + 宿 + ゆ/彳  =  魍
  -  お/頁 + ち/竹 + selector 4  =  魎
  -  お/頁 + selector 4 + い/糹/#2  =  魑
  -  お/頁 + 宿 + 囗  =  戛
  -  お/頁 + 龸 + 囗  =  戞
  -  そ/馬 + 宿 + お/頁  =  牡
  -  お/頁 + し/巿 + か/金  =  赧

Notes

Braille patterns